Harriet Hammond (October 20, 1899 – September 23, 1991) was an American actress of the silent era. She appeared in more than 40 films between 1918 and 1930.

Hammond, who was appearing in prominent roles in the Mack Sennett comedy features, was born in Kansas but had lived in Los Angeles, since her early childhood and was a graduate of Los Angeles High Schools. When scarcely out of high school she conceived the idea of becoming a concert pianist. The strain of six hours a day practice, however, proved too severe, and her health broke down. Starting as one of the Sennett Bathing Beauties she simultaneously developed great power as a comedian, and the Sennett figure. Miss Hammond appeared in "Gee Whiz!" and "By Golly." 

She was a blond, had blue eyes and weighed a hundred and fifteen pounds. Miss Hammond was five feet seven inches high, and was a splendid athlete, excelling in water sports.

Selected filmography
  
 Down on the Farm (1920)
 A Small Town Idol (1921)
 Bits of Life (1921)
 Live and Let Live (1921)
 The Golden Gift (1922)
 Confidence (1922)
 Leap Year (1924)
 Soft Shoes (1925)
 The Midshipman (1925)
 Man and Maid (1925)
 The Man from Red Gulch (1925)
 Driftin' Thru (1926)
 The Seventh Bandit (1926)
Queen of the Chorus (1928)

References

External links

1899 births
1991 deaths
Actresses from Michigan
American film actresses
American silent film actresses
20th-century American actresses